The 2020 Belgian Athletics Championships are the year's national outdoor track and field championships for Belgium. These are being held from 14 August to 16 August at the King Baudouin Stadium in Brussels, with the exception of the hammer throw events which took place in Kessel-Lo. The national championships in 10,000 metres and women's 3000 metres steeplechase took place on Saturday 27 September in Braine-l'Alleud. Due to the COVID-19 pandemic, no supporters were present at any of the events.

Results

Men

Women

References

BK Alle Categorieen-CB Toutes Categories. LiveResults. Retrieved 2020-08-16.
Championnats LRBA 10000M & 3000M Steeple Dames (F3063). liveathletics, 2020-09-27

External links
 French Belgian Athletics Federation website
 Flemish Belgian Athletics Federation website

Belgian Athletics Championships
Belgian Athletics Championships
Belgian Athletics Championships
Belgian Athletics Championships
Belgian Athletics Championships
Sports competitions in Brussels